Kovancılar District is a district of Elazığ Province of Turkey. Its seat is the town Kovancılar. Its area is 960 km2, and its population is 39,464 (2021).

Geography

The climate of the district is fairly mild to warm. Especially after the construction of Keban and Karakaya dams on the Euphrates River, the climate has mellowed to a great extent. The winter season is quite mild in the villages located on the banks of Keban Dam in the plain next to the district center. Most of the precipitation, which usually falls as rain, falls in the spring season. The average rainfall is around 500 - 600 millimeters. The hottest month of the year is July. The highest temperature is 39-40 degrees. In February, the coldest period of the year, the lowest temperature is between 20 and 25 degrees.

Composition
There is 1 municipality in Kovancılar District:
Kovancılar

There are 76 villages in Kovancılar District:

 Adalı
 Akmezra
 Aşağıdemirci
 Aşağıkanatlı
 Aşağıköse
 Aşağımirahmet
 Avlağı
 Bağgülü
 Bayramyazı
 Beşpınar
 Bilalköy
 Çakırkaş
 Çatakbaşı
 Çaybağı
 Çelebi
 Çiftlik
 Değirmentaşı
 Demirci
 Durmuşlar
 Ekinbağı
 Ekinözü
 Gedikyurt
 Göçmezler
 Gökçedal
 Gözecik
 Gülçatı
 Hacımekke
 Hacısam
 İğdeli
 İsaağamezrası
 Kacar
 Karabörk
 Karaman
 Karasungur
 Karıncaköy
 Kavakköy
 Kayalık
 Kolluca
 Köprüdere
 Kuşağacı
 Kuşçu
 Muratbağı
 Mustafaköy
 Nişankaya
 Okçular
 Osmanağa
 Payamlı
 Salkımlı
 Saraybahçe
 Sarıbuğday
 Soğanlı
 Soğukpınar
 Sürekli
 Şekerci
 Şenova
 Tabanözü
 Taşçanak
 Taşören
 Tatar
 Tepebağ
 Topağaç
 Uyandık
 Uzunova
 Vali Fahribey
 Yarımca
 Yazıbaşı
 Yenidam
 Yeniköy
 Yeşildere
 Yeşilköy
 Yılbaşı
 Yoncalıbayır
 Yukarıdemirli
 Yukarıkanatlı
 Yukarıkazanlar
 Yukarımirahmet

Economic structure 
85% of the district population is engaged in agriculture and animal husbandry. In 35% of the territory of the district, family agriculture is carried out in various forms of small enterprises. In addition, especially industrial crops (sugar beet, sunflower, cotton, etc.) are gaining importance. Especially tomatoes, peppers, onions and garlic are grown for commercial purposes. Mor Karaman breed sheep are dominant in the region and a small amount of Ivesi Ak Karaman sheep are also raised.

References

Districts of Elazığ Province